John Mayhew (27 March 1947 – 26 March 2009) was an English musician, best known for his brief tenure as the drummer of the progressive rock band Genesis. He replaced the band's previous drummer, John Silver, in August 1969, and was himself replaced in August 1970 by Phil Collins. Mayhew appears on the album Trespass, as well as the Genesis Archive 1967-75 and Genesis 1970–1975 box sets.

Early years
Mayhew grew up in Ipswich with his brother Paul who was some ten years older. His parents parted and John, who by then was in his teens, went with his father. After that he saw very little of his brother, who had remained with John's mother. He inherited his love of music from his mother, and played with bands in the Ipswich area, such as 'The Clique' and 'The Epics'. He moved to the London scene in the late sixties, where he joined another band, 'Milton's Finger', and recorded a few songs, two of which (Jenny's mother / Love of my life) ended up on an acetate 7". Ex- 'Clique' and 'Epics' member Tony Coe who was with Geno Washington at that time, remembers him jumping out of a van in Dean Street, London and saying he was with this new band 'Genesis' who were playing at Ronnie Scott's (upstairs) for £40. In early 2009 Paul Mayhew had begun a search for him, having not seen John for 18 years and having had little to do with him since the early 1970s.

Genesis
Mayhew joined Genesis in the summer of 1969 to replace departing drummer John Silver, who enrolled at Cornell University in the US to study leisure management. Despite legend saying Mayhew was recruited via an advert in Melody Maker, Mayhew said in a 2006 interview that he was contacted by Mike Rutherford after the bassist had found his phone number, which Mayhew had been leaving 'all over London'. The band was impressed by Mayhew’s long-haired appearance and professionalism, plus the fact he brought his own drums with him. As well as being a professional musician, Mayhew was also a carpenter. He installed proper panelling and seating in the band’s transport, a former bread delivery van, as well as building the cabinet for a home-made Leslie speaker that would often grind to a halt during live performances.

He famously earned himself a good-natured rebuke from his bandmates when, upon being offered a wage of £15 per week by new record company Charisma (approximately £142 as of 2016), insisted that £10 was more than enough.
Mayhew stayed with Genesis until his dismissal in July 1970. He was replaced by Phil Collins.

In his posthumous tribute to Mayhew, Tony Banks credited him with anticipating, and perhaps influencing, an important aspect of Genesis' later live shows: "John was a bit older than us and had played live in [another band] so had some knowledge of what was expected on stage. I remember him at the first show changing to go on stage; this had never occurred to us, strange since later we became almost better known for Peter's costumes than anything else. For this reason he was a very important factor in those early days on the road, having already been there before."

Post-Genesis
Little was known of Mayhew's whereabouts following his departure from Genesis. There was speculation that he was deceased or missing. In 1982, he moved to Australia, where he found work as a carpenter. In 1989, he briefly returned to England to visit his ailing mother.

In 2006, he attended a Genesis convention in London (along with Anthony Phillips and Steve Hackett), and played drums for tribute band ReGenesis's performance of "The Knife".

Death
On 26 March 2009, Mayhew died of a heart condition in  Glasgow, Scotland on the eve of his 62nd birthday. He had been working as a carpenter for a furniture company at the time of his death. He was survived by his brother.

References

External links
2006 interview with John Mayhew

1947 births
2009 deaths
English rock drummers
British male drummers
Genesis (band) members
British expatriates in Australia
Naturalised citizens of Australia
musicians from Ipswich
English carpenters
20th-century British male musicians